Julius Akumu (born 17 June 1957) is a Kenyan field hockey player. He competed at the 1984 Summer Olympics in Los Angeles, where the Kenyan team placed ninth.

References

External links
 

1957 births
Living people
Kenyan male field hockey players
Olympic field hockey players of Kenya
Field hockey players at the 1984 Summer Olympics